Baharon may refer to:

Aashiq Hoon Baharon Ka, a 1977 Indian Bollywood romance film drama directed by J. Om Prakash
Baharon Ke Sapne, a 1967 movie under Nasir Hussain films banner
Baharon Ki Manzil (1968 film), a 1968 Hindi movie directed by Yakub Hassan Rizvi
Baharon Ki Manzil (1973 film), a 1973 Pakistani film directed by S. Suleman
Baharon Phool Barsao, a 1972 Bollywood romance film